Nathan Garrett Bland  (born December 27, 1974) is a former professional baseball pitcher.

Career
Bland played high school baseball at Mountain Brook High School in Birmingham, Alabama and was drafted by the Los Angeles Dodgers in the 4th round of the 1993 Major League Baseball Draft.  He played in the Dodgers system through 1998 before missing the 1999 season with an injury.. He signed with the San Diego Padres for 2000 but was cut at the end of spring training and signed with the Sioux City Explorers of the Independent Northern League. He then played in the farm system of the New York Mets and with the independent Chico Heat of the Western Baseball League before finally making his Major League debut with the Houston Astros in 2003. He appeared in 22 games with the Astros, with a 1–2 record and 5.75 ERA. He later played in the farm systems of the Chicago Cubs and Los Angeles Angels of Anaheim and spent spring training with the Seattle Mariners. He finished up his career in the Mexican League in 2005 and 2007 and played one year in Taiwan in 2008 before retiring.

External links

1974 births
Living people
American expatriate baseball players in Mexico
Bakersfield Blaze players
Bakersfield Dodgers players
Baseball players from Alabama
Binghamton Mets players
Chico Heat players
Great Falls Dodgers players
Houston Astros players
Iowa Cubs players
Major League Baseball pitchers
Mexican League baseball pitchers
New Orleans Zephyrs players
Potros de Tijuana players
Salt Lake Bees players
San Antonio Missions players
Savannah Sand Gnats players
Sioux City Explorers players
Vaqueros Laguna players
Vero Beach Dodgers players
Yakima Bears players
Tomateros de Culiacán players
Scottsdale Scorpions players
Dmedia T-REX players
American expatriate baseball players in Taiwan